The Ardent-class ships of the line were a class of seven 64-gun third rates, designed for the Royal Navy by Sir Thomas Slade.

Design
Slade based the design of the Ardent class on the captured French ship .

Ships

Builder: Blades, Hull
Ordered: 16 December 1761
Launched: 13 August 1764
Fate: Sold out of the service, 1784

Builder: Chatham Dockyard
Ordered: 11 January 1763
Launched: 10 December 1768
Fate: Broken up, 1815

Builder: Adams, Bucklers Hard
Ordered: 8 April 1777
Launched: 10 April 1781
Fate: Wrecked, 1809

Builder: Perry, Blackwall Yard
Ordered: 19 February 1778
Launched: 5 June 1780
Fate: Broken up, 1816

Builder: Raymond, Northam
Ordered: 10 December 1778
Launched: 27 December 1784
Fate: Broken up, 1814

Builder: Adams, Bucklers Hard
Ordered: 3 August 1780
Launched: July 1784
Fate: Broken up, 1816

Builder: Hilhouse, Bristol
Ordered: 14 November 1782
Launched: 28 September 1785
Fate: Wrecked, 1799

References

Lavery, Brian (2003) The Ship of the Line – Volume 1: The development of the battlefleet 1650–1850. Conway Maritime Press. .

 
Ship of the line classes